Andrew K. Golden (born 25 May 1959) is an American investor, endowment fund manager, and philanthropist. He is currently the president of the Princeton University Investment Company which manages Princeton University's financial endowment which as of February 2017 sits at $22.2 billion USD.

Early life and education 
Golden studied at Duke University and holds a master's degree at Yale School of Management. Golden also holds the Chartered Financial Analyst designation.

Investment career 
Before joining Princeton in 1995, Golden worked with David Swensen as an intern and then as Portfolio Manager at Yale's Investment Office from 1988 to 1993.

In 2005, the universities endowment earned a rate-of-return of 17%, bringing the value of the endowment up to $11.2 billion (up from $9.9 billion a year ago). According to the Princeton University Investment Company the endowment had a compound rate-of-return of 15.6% over the ten years of 1995 to 2005. Golden said of the achievement: “When you have a mission to preserve purchasing power into perpetuity, in some sense a year is a pretty short period of time,” Golden said. “Seventeen percent is gratifying, but we take that in stride, just as we would take in stride a 2 percent year.”

Investment philosophy 
Golden's principle investment strategy focuses on long-term high-yield returns through an "aggressive, equity-biased approach." He has stated that because the university's endowment has  relatively low spending requirements, he is free to engage in fund management that tolerates "above-average volatility and below-average liquidity."

References

External links 
Princeton endowment article (2005)
Yale endowment article (2005)
Princeton endowment article (1996)

Yale School of Management alumni
Duke University alumni
American money managers
Living people
CFA charterholders
1959 births